Pete Murray may refer to:

 Pete Murray (Australian singer-songwriter) (born 1969), Australian singer-songwriter and guitarist
 Pete Murray (DJ) (born 1925), British radio and television presenter and actor
 Pete Murray (American musician), American musician and singer-songwriter

See also 
 Peter Murray (disambiguation)